The war on drugs is a United States government campaign against illegal drug trade.

War on Drugs may also refer to:

The Colombian conflict, an asymmetric war beginning in the 1960s
Mexican drug war, an armed conflict between the Mexican government and drug trafficking cartels since 2006
 The Miami drug war, a violent conflict in the 1980s involving drug baroness Griselda Blanco and the police
Philippine drug war, a crackdown beginning in 2016
Puerto Rican drug war
Bangladesh drug war, a crackdown in 2018 
 Lin Zexu, Manchu Qing Dynasty official who led a campaign to destroy opium imports; actions of which ultimately leading to the Opium War

Popular culture
The War on Drugs (film), a 2007 documentary
The War on Drugs (band)
 "War on Drugs", a song by Barenaked Ladies from Everything to Everyone

See also
 The Civil War on Drugs, a comedy sketch series from the TV show The Whitest Kids U' Know
 Drug wars (disambiguation)